Stannane  or tin hydride is an inorganic compound with the chemical formula . It is a colourless gas and the tin analogue of methane.

Stannane decomposes slowly at room temperature to give metallic tin and hydrogen and ignites on contact with air.

Variants of stannane can be found as a highly toxic, gaseous, inorganic metal hydride and group 14 hydride.

See also 

 Organotin

References 

Tin(IV) compounds
Metal hydrides
Reducing agents